Mostofa Jalal Mohiuddin (15 March 1951) is a Bangladesh Awami League politician and the former Member of Parliament of Dhaka-7. He is the incumbent President of the Bangladesh Medical Association (BMA) and Awami League Presidium member since December 2022.

Career
Mohiuddin was president of the Bangladesh Chhatra League, the student wing of the Awami League, from 1981 to 1983.

Mohiuddin was elected to parliament from Dhaka-7 as a Bangladesh Awami League candidate in 2008. In September 2014, his supporters attacked the supporters of his successor, Haji Mohammad Salim.

References

Living people
1951 births
Awami League politicians
9th Jatiya Sangsad members